In role-playing video games, a paper doll is a way of representing a player character's inventory and currently used equipment. In games that use a paper doll inventory management system, the sprites or 3D models of equipment, such as clothing or armour, can be placed on top of an image of the player character. This is similar to how the paper cut-outs of real-world paper dolls are used.

The innovative and very successful Dungeon Master popularized the paper doll interface. Using a paper doll inventory system is either done by dragging equipment in place, or by selecting them from a list. In games with multiple main characters, the different player characters are usually shown posing the same way. In some cases, there are multiple poses for the characters. For example, there may one unique pose when a one-handed weapon is equipped, and another when a two-handed weapon is equipped.

Typically, the paper dolls are a separate part of the inventory management. Sometimes, however, the in-game character sprite or model itself acts as a paper doll on which equipment can be put; an example of this would be Ultima IX: Ascension.

Use
The paper doll-approach of inventory management is useful when a game makes a distinction between different parts of a character's body in combat. It has also been cited to feel more realistic to place armour manually on one's character. On the other hand, a paper doll inventory requires a large interface, as it has to show the entire character.

See also
Dollz
Kisekae Set System

References

Video game terminology